Democratic Union Party (in Spanish: Partido Unión Democrático) was a political party in Peru that was founded in 1947 by Paulino Prado Altamirano.

1947 establishments in Peru
Defunct political parties in Peru
Political parties established in 1947
Political parties with year of disestablishment missing